Divotino (Bulgarian: Дивотино) is a village in western Bulgaria, located in Oblast Pernik, Obshtina Pernik.

Geography 
Divotino is a village in Bulgaria located 4 km north of Pernik, at the foot of Lyulin mountain.

History 
The village of Divotino is an old, medieval settlement, inscribed in the lists of the Djelepkeshans from 1576 under the name  Дивотине (Divotine), to the Grahova nahia of the Kaaza Sofia. The village is first mentioned in Ottoman registers from the 15th century. Remains of the primitive municipal system (Neolithic, Paleolithic) have been found in its territory. The Liberation of Bulgaria passed almost silently for the inhabitants of the village of Divotino: about fifteen Russian officers descended from Lyulin, but as they did not find Turkish inhabitants in the village, they continued to Pernik and Radomir.

Religion 

Only Orthodox Christians have always lived in the village, even during the Ottoman rule. There is a church in the village. Nearby is the Divotin Monastery „St. Trinity“.

Notable people 

 Stojan Popov (1865 – 1939), child writer

Honour 
Divotino Point on Robert Island in the South Shetland Islands, Antarctica is named after Divotino.

References 

Villages in Pernik Province